Labeobarbus lucius is a species of cyprinid fish found in Angola and the Republic of the Congo.

References 

Cyprinid fish of Africa
lucius
Taxa named by George Albert Boulenger
Fish described in 1910